James Scheibel (born August 30, 1947) is an American politician who was endorsed by the Minnesota Democratic-Farmer-Labor Party.  From 1990 to 1994, he served as the mayor of Saint Paul, Minnesota, succeeding George Latimer and succeeded by Norm Coleman.

A graduate of Saint John's University, he worked as a community organizer, as aide to former mayor Lawrence D. Cohen, as national organizer for Fred R. Harris's 1976 presidential campaign, and as deputy director for Volunteers in Service to America (VISTA). Elected to the Saint Paul City Council in 1982, he served there until his election as mayor.

As mayor, Scheibel led efforts to tackle the problems of homelessness, hunger and refugee services. He is one of a few members of the Democratic Socialists of America to be elected to office.

After his mayoralty, Scheibel served as vice president for the Corporation for National and Community Service and as a nonprofit executive. He now chairs the 21st Century Democrats, a progressive electoral coalition active within the national Democratic Party, and is a member of the Saint Paul Area Council of Churches. He teaches at Hamline University and is the interim executive director of the Minnesota Campus Compact. Scheibel was recently appointed president of AARP Minnesota, which has more than 650,000 members. He was instrumental in the launch of AmeriCorps.

See also
List of Democratic Socialists of America who have held office in the United States

References

1947 births
20th-century American politicians
College of Saint Benedict and Saint John's University alumni
Living people
Mayors of Saint Paul, Minnesota
Democratic Socialists of America politicians from Minnesota
Minnesota city council members
Minnesota Democrats
Volunteers in Service to America administrators